The Magisterium of Pope Pius XII consists of some 1,600 mostly non-political speeches, messages, radio and television speeches, homilies, apostolic letters, and encyclicals of Pope Pius XII. His magisterium has been largely neglected or even overlooked by his biographers, who center on the policies of his pontificate.

The dates of the list may vary in accuracy. The list uses the official dates of the Discorsi and Acta Apostolicae Sedis, published by the Holy See. However, not all speeches are included there. Some were published in the Vatican newspaper, L'Osservatore Romano, and those dates reflect the date of publication since the articles often did not indicate a different time. Therefore, there may be a difference of a day or two in some instances. The sources are listed below.

Of the 1600 papal addresses, this list includes the last fifty during the last five months of his pontificate. They also illustrate the papal work load, up to the last days of his life. "He was the last Pope who wrote most of his speeches alone" said Cardinal Joseph Ratzinger. Pius, who did not have a staff of speechwriters or permanent assistants, worked largely alone, assisted only by occasional help and proofreaders from professors of the Pontifical Gregorian University. The combined length and scope of these 50 speeches, written within only 150 days, suggest a brutal work load for Pius, which may have contributed to his death. His physician, Professor Gasparini, commented: "The Holy Father did not die because of any specific illness. He was completely exhausted. He was overworked beyond limit. His heart was healthy, his lungs were good. He could have lived another 20 years, had he spared himself."

Sources
  Acta Apostolicae Sedis. (AAS), Vatican City 1939-1958. Official documents of the Pontificate of Pope Pius XII 
  Pio XII, Discorsi e Radio Messaggi di Sua Santita Pio XII, Vatican City 1939-1958,Official speeches of Pius XII, 20 vol. 
  Pio XII, Discorsi Ai Medici collected byFiorenzo Angelini, Roma, 1959, 725 pages,  
  Soziale Summe Pius XII ed. A.F.Utz, J.F.Gröner, 4010 pages. in German, the non-theological teachings 1939-1958, 3 vol. 
  Pascalina Lehnert, Ich durfte ihm dienen. Erinnerungen an Papst Pius XII. Naumann, Würzburg, 1983.

Quotes

Works by Pope Pius XII